The Battle of Xinfeng was an offensive during the Second Sino-Japanese War.

Battle
On 1 July 1938, Chinese troops of the 1st Battalion, 2nd Regiment of the 1st Detachment of the New Fourth Army launched a surprise assault on the Japanese troops stationed at the Xinfeng Railway Station. This was the first battle that the Fourth Army fought at night, as  the assault was launched at 11 pm. The unit then set the railway station on fire and killed more than 30 soldiers that were in houses at the time.

During the battle the train station was burned to the ground and the army forces managed to capture six rifles with bayonets. After the battle, the Chinese unit met with local resistance fighters and managed to destroy a section of the railway and tens of telephone stations.

References

Battles of the Second Sino-Japanese War
1938 in China
1938 in Japan
Night battles
July 1938 events